Webbers Falls Lake, also known as Webbers Falls Reservoir, is a reservoir created by a lock and dam on the Arkansas River in Muskogee County, Oklahoma. It is an integral part (Lock and Dam No. 16) of the McClellan-Kerr Arkansas River Navigation System, which was completed in 1971.

There is an observation platform and visitor facility at the lock and dam, where visitors can view the operation of the locks during passage of river craft.

The project was authorized by Congress in the River and Harbor Act July 4, 1946, and amended by the Flood Control Acts of 1948 and 1950. Construction began in January 1965 and became operational for navigation in December 1970.

See also 
Arkansas River
McClellan-Kerr Arkansas River Navigation System
2019 Arkansas River floods

References 

Reservoirs in Oklahoma
Landforms of Muskogee County, Oklahoma
Dams completed in 1970
Protected areas of Muskogee County, Oklahoma